Ezogelin soup or Ezo gelin soup ("the soup of Ezo the bride") is a common soup in Turkish cuisine. The main ingredients are bulgur and red lentils. The origin of the soup is attributed to Ezo the bride from Gaziantep.

The ingredients are red lentils, rice, bulgur, olive oil, butter, onion, garlic, tomato, tomato paste, paprika, hot pepper, dried mint, black pepper, and salt; it is usually served with lemon wedges.

See also

 Lentil soup
 Dal
 List of soups

References

Further reading

External links

 Recipe 
   (2006 TV series about Ezo the bride)

Turkish soups
Lentil dishes
Bulgur dishes